1846 in sports describes the year's events in world sport.

Baseball
Events
 19 June — first match certainly played under the Knickerbocker rules at Elysian Fields in Hoboken, New Jersey.

Boxing
Events
 William Thompson retains the Championships of England but there is no record of any fights involving him in 1846.

Cricket
Events
 25 & 26 May — the earliest-known first-class match at The Oval was Surrey Club v. MCC
 25 & 26 June — the new Surrey County Cricket Club played its inaugural first-class match v. Kent County Cricket Club at The Oval, winning by 10 wickets
 Foundation of the travelling All-England Eleven (AEE) by William Clarke.  Making good use of the developing railway network, the team plays its first matches at Sheffield, Manchester and Leeds.
England
 Most runs – Thomas Box 413 @ 20.65 (HS 79)
 Most wickets – William Hillyer 152 @ 6.83 (BB 7–?)

Horse racing
England
 Grand National – Pioneer
 1,000 Guineas Stakes – Mendicant 
 2,000 Guineas Stakes – Sir Tatton Sykes
 The Derby – Pyrrhus the First
 The Oaks – Mendicant 
 St. Leger Stakes – Sir Tatton Sykes

Rowing
The Boat Race
 3 April — Cambridge wins the 8th Oxford and Cambridge Boat Race

References

External links

 
Sports by year